The Taichung Suns are a Taiwanese professional basketball team based in Taichung City, Taiwan. They have competed in the T1 League since the 2021–22 season, and play their home games at the National Taiwan University of Sport Gymnasium. The Suns became one of the six teams of the inaugural T1 League season. On November 25, 2021, Taichung Suns changed the name to Taichung Wagor Suns. In October 2022, Taichung Wagor Suns changed the name to Taichung Suns.

Home arenas
National Taiwan University of Sport Gymnasium (2021–present)

Current roster 

<noinclude>

Personnel

General managers

Head coaches

Season-by-season record

Notable players
Local players
  Peng Chun-Yen (彭俊諺) – Chinese Taipei men's national basketball team player
  Su Yi-Chin (蘇奕晉) – Chinese Taipei men's national basketball team player
  Sun Szu-Yao (孫思堯) – Chinese Taipei men's national basketball team player
Type-III players
  Jordan Heading – Philippines men's national basketball team player
Import players
  Keith Benson – NBA player
  Tony Bishop – Panama men's national basketball team player
  Alonzo Gee – NBA player
  Aaron Geramipoor – Iran men's national basketball team player
  Arnett Moultrie – NBA player
  Sani Sakakini – Palestine men's national basketball team player
  Diamond Stone – NBA player
  Julian Wright – NBA player

References

External links
 
 
 
 

 
T1 League teams
2021 establishments in Taiwan
Basketball teams established in 2021
Sport in Taichung